The cardinal electors in the 1958 papal conclave were 53, of whom 51 participated. This list is arranged by region and within each alphabetically. Two were impeded from attending by their Communist governments: József Mindszenty was confined to the U.S. Embassy in Budapest, and Aloysius Stepinac was under house arrest in Yugoslavia. A 54th cardinal, Edward Mooney of Detroit, traveled to Rome to attend the papal conclave, but died of a heart attack three hours before it began.

Roman Curia
Benedetto Aloisi Masella, Camerlengo, Prefect of Discipline of the Sacraments
Nicola Canali, Major Penitentiary
Gaetano Cicognani, Prefect of Apostolic Signatura
Pietro Ciriaci, Prefect of Congregation of the Council
Pietro Fumasoni Biondi, Prefect of the Congregation for the Propagation of the Faith
Marcello Mimmi, Secretary of Consistorial Congregation
Alfredo Ottaviani, Pro-Secretary of the Holy Office
Giuseppe Pizzardo, Secretary of Holy Office, Prefect of Seminaries and Universities
Federico Tedeschini, Datary of His Holiness
Eugène-Gabriel-Gervais-Laurent Tisserant, Dean of the College of Cardinals, Secretary of Oriental Churches
Valerio Valeri, Prefect of Religious

Europe

Italy
Elia Dalla Costa, Archbishop of Florence
Maurilio Fossati, OSsCGN, Archbishop of Turin
Giacomo Lercaro, Archbishop of Bologna
Clemente Micara, Vicar General of Rome
Angelo Giuseppe Roncalli, Patriarch of Venice (was elected and chose the name John XXIII)
Ernesto Ruffini, Archbishop of Palermo
Giuseppe Siri, Archbishop of Genoa

France
Maurice Feltin, Archbishop of Paris
Pierre-Marie Gerlier, Archbishop of Lyon
Georges-François-Xavier-Marie Grente, Archbishop-Bishop of Le Mans
Achille Liénart, Bishop of Lille
Clément-Emile Roques, Archbishop of Rennes

Spain
Benjamín de Arriba y Castro, Archbishop of Tarragona
Enrique Pla y Deniel, Archbishop of Toledo
Fernando Quiroga y Palacios, Archbishop of Santiago de Compostela

Germany
Josef Frings, Archbishop of Cologne
Joseph Wendel, Archbishop of Munich and Freising

Belgium
Jozef-Ernest van Roey, Archbishop of Mechelen

Hungary
József Mindszenty, Archbishop of Esztergom (absent)

Ireland and United Kingdom
John D'Alton, Archbishop of Armagh (archdiocese contains territory in both the Republic of Ireland and Northern Ireland)

Poland
Stefan Wyszyński, Archbishop of Warsaw and Gniezno

Portugal
Manuel Gonçalves Cerejeira, Patriarch of Lisbon

Soviet Union
Gregorio Pietro Agagianian, Patriarch of Cilicia of the Armenians

Yugoslavia
Aloysius Stepinac, Archbishop of Zagreb (absent)

North America

Canada
Paul-Émile Léger, PSS, Archbishop of Montreal
James Charles McGuigan, Archbishop of Toronto

United States
James Francis McIntyre, Archbishop of Los Angeles
Francis Spellman, Archbishop of New York

South America

Brazil
Jaime de Barros Câmara, Archbishop of São Sebastião de Rio de Janeiro
Augusto da Silva, Archbishop of São Salvador da Bahia
Carlos Carmelo Vasconcellos Motta, Archbishop of São Paulo

Argentina
Antonio Caggiano, Bishop of Rosario
Santiago Copello, Archbishop of Buenos Aires

Chile
José Caro Rodríguez, Archbishop of Santiago

Colombia
Crisanto Luque Sánchez, Archbishop of Bogotá

Cuba
Manuel Arteaga y Betancourt, Archbishop of San Cristobal de la Habana

Ecuador
Carlos María de la Torre, Archbishop of Quito

Asia

China
Thomas Tien Ken-sin, SVD, Archbishop of Beijing

India
Valerian Gracias, Archbishop of Bombay

Syria
Ignatius Gabriel I Tappuni, Patriarch of Antioch of the Syrians (born in Mosul, in modern-day Iraq)

Africa

Mozambique
Teódosio de Gouveia, Archbishop of Lourenço Marques

Oceania

Australia
Norman Gilroy, Archbishop of Sydney

References

Conclave of October 25 - 28, 1958

Pope John XXIII
1958